Lips is a Dutch and German patronymic surname, "Lip" being a short form of Filip or Philip. People with this name include:

Bruno Lips (1908–1939), Swiss canoer
Charles C. Lips (ca. 1835–1888), German-born American civil servant
Constantine Lips (died 917), Byzantine aristocrat and admiral
Hannie Lips (1924–2012), Dutch broadcaster and television announcer
Joest Lips (1547–1606), Flemish philologist and humanist better known as "Lipsius"
Johann Heinrich Lips (1758–1817), Swiss copper engraver
Karen Lips (born 1995), American biologist
Michael Lips (born 1967), Swiss curler
Miriam Lips (born 1967), Dutch-born New Zealand academic
Robert Lips (1912–1975), Swiss cartoonist and fencer
Thomas Lips (born 1970), Swiss curler
Tim Lips (born 1985), Dutch equestrian
Tom Lips (born 1968), American soccer player

See also
Marjolein Lips-Wiersma, New Zealand academic

References

Dutch-language surnames
German-language surnames
Patronymic surnames